Michael Delaney may refer to:

 Michael C. Delaney (1849–1918), Canadian politician
 Michael Delaney (lawyer) (born 1969), American lawyer and politician
 Mick Delaney, American college football coach
 Michael Delaney, stage name Dub-L, American record producer and songwriter
 Michael Delaney, Steve McQueen's character in the 1971 film Le Mans

See also
 Michael Devaney (disambiguation)
 Mike Douglas (Michael Delaney Dowd Jr., 1920–2006), American entertainer